The Bogdanovskoye is a large coal field located in the east of Ukraine in Donetsk Oblast. Bogdanovskoye represents one of the largest coal reserve in Ukraine having estimated reserves of 3.5 billion tonnes of coal.

See also 
List of coalfields

References 

Coal mining regions in Ukraine